It Started in Paradise is a 1952 British drama film directed by Compton Bennett and starring Jane Hylton, Martita Hunt and Muriel Pavlow.  Set in the world of haute couture, the film was squarely aimed at female audiences.  Its storyline of an established master of her craft being usurped by a younger, ruthlessly ambitious underling, who then years later finds the same thing happening to her – with a waspish male critic on hand throughout to provide a steady stream of acerbic, biting commentary – led inevitably to the film being dubbed the All About Eve of the fashion world.

The film was made at Pinewood Studios with sets designed by the art director Edward Carrick. It was shot in Technicolor and is described by Hal Erickson of Allmovie as: "an unusually plush, Lana Turner-esque production to come from a British studio in the early 1950s".

The title is a wry suggestion that Adam, by his crafting of the fig leaves for Eve and for himself to wear, also began the fashion industry.

Plot
In 1938, Mme. Alice (Hunt), chief designer of a famous London fashion house, has lost her touch.  Where once she was the most sought after designer in the city, now her creations seem locked in the past and clients are looking elsewhere for modern fashions.  She is persuaded by her senior assistant Martha (Hylton) that she needs a long holiday to recapture her creative inspiration.  Once Mme. Alice has departed the fiercely ambitious Martha, who has been biding her time for several years, launches a coup, designing and presenting a range of up-to-the-minute garments which are a huge success with the fashion media and bring clients flocking back to the salon.  The financial backer of the business is delighted with the upturn in profits;  Martha is promoted to chief designer and Mme. Upon Alice's return, whilst retaining her composure, she refuses to countenance the Salon's "Vulgar" new look, prophesies Martha's doom, and walks out, parting forever from the fashion world.

Over the course of the next decade Martha, with the help of Alison (Pavlow), a talented girl she took on straight out of school, restores the house to its pre-eminent position in the London fashion world.  She becomes so driven that she starts not to care whom she treads on in her quest to be the best in the business.  Over the years while her professional career goes from strength to strength, she neglects friends, treats associates badly and makes business enemies.

By the start of the 1950's Martha too seems to have had her day;  appreciation for her designs tapers off, after a failed love affair with a deceiving lothatio, and her reputation falls. Those she has alienated on the way up are only too happy to watch her on the way down. Meanwhile, Alison, having initially declined to return after finding great success in America, eventually decides to return after all, prompted more by loyalty to one whom she loves at the company more than any sentimentality for Martha. Her own designs are acclaimed  innovative and contemporary by all.  Now, it's Alison who's 'in', and Martha who's 'out': the cycle may begin again.

Cast

 Jane Hylton as Martha Watkins
 Ian Hunter as Arthur Turner
 Terence Morgan as Edouard
 Muriel Pavlow as Alison
 Martita Hunt as Mme. Alice
 Brian Worth as Michael
 Kay Kendall as Lady Caroline Frencham
 Ronald Squire as Mary Jane
 Dana Wynter as Barbara
 Joyce Barbour as Lady Burridge
 Harold Lang as Mr. Louis
 Margaret Withers as Miss Madge
 Lucienne Hill as Mme. Lucienne
 Diana Decker as Crystal Leroy
 Arthur Lane as Sydney Bruce
 Audrey White as 	Gwen, the model 
 Naomi Chance as Primrose, the model 
 Barbara Allen as	Anne, the model 
 Dorinda Stevens as Flo the barmaid 
 Anna Turner	as Lil the barmaid
 Frank Tickle as	Mr. Paul 
 Helen Forrest as	Maureen
 Mara Lane as 'Little Dark Popsie' 
 Avis Scott as Journalist 
 Conrad Phillips as 	1st Photographer 
 Bill Travers as	2nd Photographer
 Alan Gifford as 	American captain
 Bruce Seton as Club Manager 
 Valerie Mewes as Model (uncredited)

Critical reception
The Times gave a scathing review of the film in 1952, saying: "The boldest pen may be excused from shying away like a nervous horse at a high fence from this truly deplorable film. Its world is the world of Haute Couture. It has probably got most of the details right and very admirable are some of the Technicolor backgrounds, but that is the most that can be said in its favour".

The New York Times was also less than enthusiastic, drawing comparisons with the earlier  British fashion picture Maytime in Mayfair and commenting that British films about haute couture: "have a tendency to run somewhat to froth". It concluded: "Well, let's be gentlemanly about it. Maybe there are those who can find some sort of excitement in the kind of lather worked up in this film". It did, however, comment that Ronald Squire had a few good lines and the visual portrayal of the dress salon was well defined.

Guide to British Cinema in 2003 described it as starting strongly, but with a disappointing climax.

References

External links 
 
 

1952 films
1952 drama films
Films directed by Compton Bennett
Films about fashion in the United Kingdom
Films shot at Pinewood Studios
British drama films
Films scored by Malcolm Arnold
Films set in 1938
Films set in the 1940s
Films set in the 1950s
Films set in London
1950s English-language films
1950s British films